Thomas Gill (1870 – 1941) was an American architect who worked in Honolulu, Hawaii, from 1899 to 1941.

Early life and education 
Born in Brooklyn, New York, he studied at Brooklyn Polytechnic and Pratt Institute.

Career 
Gill began his career in 1892 with Walbridge & Walbridge of Brooklyn, and later worked in Bellingham, Washington, before embarking on a world tour that landed him in Honolulu on December 9, 1898. There he found work with H. L. Kerr before opening up his own office in 1903. He was a founding member of the Oahu Country Club and designed its clubhouse, but otherwise designed mostly private residences, two of which are on the National Register of Historic Places: the Edgar and Lucy Henriques House (1904) and the Thomas Alexander Burningham House (1910).

Personal life 
His son, Thomas Gill, became a prominent local politician.

References

1870 births
1941 deaths
Architects from Hawaii
Hawaiian architecture